Malli Malli Choodali is a 2002 Indian Telugu film written and directed by Pawans Sreedhar, starring Venu Thottempudi and Janani, in lead and the likes of Vizag Prasad, 'Costumes' Krishna, Sobha Rani, Ali and Brahmanandam among others in supporting roles. The film released on 28 March 2002 and proved to be very unsuccessful at the box-office.

Cast 

Venu Thottempudi as Pavan
 Janani as Gayatri
 Vizag Prasad as Jagadish Prasad Gayatri's father
 Costumes Krishna as Ramachandra Rao, Pavan's father,
 Sobha Rani as Gayatri's mother
 Ali
 Brahmanandam
 Babu Mohan
 Mallikarjuna Rao
 Ravi Shankar
 Venu Madhav
 G. V. Ramji
 King Kong
 Kovai Sarala
 Deepa
 Anitha Chowdary

Soundtrack

The music was composed by noted Tamil film composer Yuvan Shankar Raja. The soundtrack, released on 28 February 2002 at Hotel Green Park in Hyderabad, features 6 tracks overall, out of which 2 songs were earlier used in two Tamil films. The lyrics were written by Bhuvanachandra, Chandrabose and Kulashekhar.

External links
 Malli Malli Choodali review at Full Hyderabad
 Malli Malli Choodali preview at Idlebrain
 Listen to Malli Malli Choodali songs at Raaga

2002 films
2000s Telugu-language films